James Powell may refer to:

Sports
Jay Powell (baseball) (James Willard Powell, born 1972), Major League Baseball pitcher
Jim Powell (baseball) (1859–1929), Major League Baseball player
Jim Powell (sportscaster), announcer for the Milwaukee Brewers and Atlanta Braves
Jimmy Powell (golfer) (1935–2021), PGA Tour and Champions Tour golfer
James Powell (cricketer, born 1792) (1792–1870), English cricketer
James Powell (cricketer, born 1899) (1899–1973), English cricketer
James Powell (cricketer, born 1982), Welsh cricketer

Music
Jimmy Powell (musician) (1914–1994), American jazz saxophonist
Jimmy Powell (singer) (born 1942), British rhythm and blues singer

Science
James L. Powell (born 1936), American geologist and environmentalist
James R. Powell (physicist), American physicist

Fiction and poetry
Jim Powell (British novelist) (born 1949)
Jim Powell (poet), American poet, translator, literary critic, MacArthur Fellow, classicist
James Powell (author) (born 1932), author of mystery and humorous short stories

Other
James Powell and Sons, British stained glass manufacturers
James Powell (1774–1840), British glassmaker, founder of James Powell and Sons
Jim Powell (filmmaker), American documentary filmmaker
Jim Powell (historian), fellow at libertarian think tank the Cato Institute
James R. Powell (politician), founder of the city of Birmingham, Alabama, mayor and state politician
James Powell, African American teenager whose shooting led to the Harlem riot of 1964